Peter Smith (8 March 1935 – 11 December 2013) was a New Zealand cricketer. He played in four first-class matches for Northern Districts in 1956/57.

See also
 List of Northern Districts representative cricketers

References

External links
 

1935 births
2013 deaths
New Zealand cricketers
Northern Districts cricketers
Cricketers from Wellington City